William F. Dettinger (September 24, 1880 – July 3, 1952) was an American farmer and politician.

Born in the town of Northfield, Jackson County, Wisconsin, Dettinger took the short agricultural course at University of Wisconsin. He was a farmer and livestock dealer in the town of Northfield. Dettinger worked for the Armour Packing Company for five years. He was president of the York Creamery Association. Dettinger served on the Northfield Town Board and was chairman of the town board. He was the Jackson County health officer. From 1919 to 1927 and from 1931 to 1935, Dettinger served in the Wisconsin State Assembly and was a Republican and a Progressive. In 1940, Dettinger moved to the town of Blooming Grove, Dane County, Wisconsin. Dettinger served as chairman of the Blooming Grove Town Board and on the Dane County Board of Supervisors. Dettinger died suddenly at his home in Blooming Grove, Wisconsin.

Notes

1880 births
1952 deaths
People from Blooming Grove, Wisconsin
People from Jackson County, Wisconsin
University of Wisconsin–Madison College of Agricultural and Life Sciences alumni
Farmers from Wisconsin
Wisconsin Progressives (1924)
Mayors of places in Wisconsin
Wisconsin city council members
County supervisors in Wisconsin
Republican Party members of the Wisconsin State Assembly
20th-century American politicians